Lewisburg is an unincorporated community located in DeSoto County, Mississippi, United States.

A post office began operation under the name Lewisburg in 1872.

Education
Lewisburg is served by the DeSoto County School District

Lewisburg Primary School serves students from Kindergarten to 1st grade. Lewisburg Elementary School serves students grades 2-3. Lewisburg Intermediate School serves grades 4-5. Lewisburg Middle School serves grades 6-8, and Lewisburg High School serves grades 9-12.

Notable person
 John C. Lauderdale, member of the Mississippi House of Representatives from 1916 to 1920 and the Mississippi Senate from 1940 to 1944

References

Unincorporated communities in DeSoto County, Mississippi
Unincorporated communities in Mississippi
Memphis metropolitan area